Anectropis is a genus of moths in the family Geometridae described by Sato in 1991.

Selected species
Anectropis fumigata Sato, 1991
Anectropis semifascia (Bastelberger, 1909)

Ennominae
Geometridae genera